Gelab (also Romanized as Gelāb, Galāb, and Golāb; also known as Qal‘eh Golāb) is a village in Meymand Rural District, in the Central District of Shahr-e Babak County, Kerman Province, Iran. At the 2006 census, its population was 166, in 40 families.

References 

Populated places in Shahr-e Babak County